Nelima is a genus of harvestmen in the family Sclerosomatidae.

Species
 Nelima adelheidiana Martens, 1965
 Nelima aladjensis Mitov, 1997
 Nelima albiangulata Roewer, 1957
 Nelima aokii Suzuki, 1974
 Nelima apenninica Martens, 1969
 Nelima atrorubra Roewer, 1910
 Nelima coreana S. Suzuki, 1983
 Nelima cretica Martens, 1965
 Nelima doriae (Canestrini, 1871)
 Nelima elegans (Weed, 1889)
 Nelima fuscifrons (Simon, 1879)
 Nelima genufusca (Karsch, 1881)
 Nelima globulifer Kishida
 Nelima gothica Lohmander, 1945
 Nelima hiraiwai Sato & Suzuki, 1939
 Nelima hispana Martens, 1969
 Nelima humilis (L.Koch, 1869)
 Nelima insignita Roewer, 1957
 Nelima kansuensis Schenkel, 1953
 Nelima longipedata Mkheidze, 1952
 Nelima lutea Roewer, 1957
 Nelima magaritata Roewer, 1957
 Nelima maroccana Roewer, 1957
 Nelima melanodorsum Roewer, 1911
 Nelima mexicana C.J.Goodnight & M.L.Goodnight, 1942
 Nelima morova C.J.Goodnight & M.L.Goodnight, 1944
 Nelima nigricoxa Sato & Suzuki, 1939
 Nelima nigromaculata (Lucas, 1847)
 Nelima okinawaensis Suzuki, 1964
 Nelima paessleri (Roewer, 1910)
 Nelima parva Suzuki, 1974
 Nelima pontica Ljovuschkin & Starobogatov, 1963
 Nelima ponticoides Martins, 1969
 Nelima recurvipenis Martins, 1969
 Nelima saghalina Roewer, 1957
 Nelima satoi Suzuki, 1944
 Nelima semproni Szalay, 1951
 Nelima silvatica (Simon, 1879)
 Nelima similis Suzuki, 1974
 Nelima taiwana Suzuki, 1977
 Nelima tancitaro C.J.Goodnight & M.L.Goodnight, 1942
 Nelima troglodytes Roewer, 1910
 Nelima valida Kishida
 Nelima victorae Roewer, 1957

References

Harvestmen
Harvestman genera